Bothrostethus is a genus of family Coreidae, subfamily Pseudophloeinae.

Species 
 Bothrostethus annulipes (A. Costa, 1847)

References 

 BioLib
 Fauna Europaea

Coreidae genera
Pseudophloeinae